Gordonia was a Zionist youth movement. The movement's doctrines were based on the beliefs of Aaron David Gordon, i.e. the redemption of Eretz Yisrael and the Jewish People through manual labor and the revival of the Hebrew language. In Gordonia the cadets learned Hebrew and the graduates organized themselves into training groups pending aliyah to the Holy Land.

History
Founded in 1925 in Poland, the movement promoted aliyah to kibbutzim in Mandate Palestine during the inter-war period. These pioneering initiatives were crucial in the development of the kibbutz movement in Palestine and the state of Israel as a whole.

Being established after many of the other socialist Zionist movements, Gordonia, in its early years struggled existentially. Emerging from ideological crisis, Gordonia was seen as a reaction against what was perceived as the "fatal errors" of movements such as the Hashomer Hatzair, whom they viewed as adopting ‘foreign ideals’ (e.g. Marxism), which threatened to divert attention from the important historical pioneering task. Gordonia saw itself as the pioneering youth movement of the Jewish masses – rejecting theoretical ideals of socialism and romanticism in favour of practical pioneering as embodied in Gordon himself. The principal distinction between Gordonia and the other movements was its decision not to engage in political activities, in alignment with the philosophies of their figurehead.

The United States branch of Gordonia was small and largely based in the Washington D.C.-Baltimore and Dallas areas, with only one summer camp, Moshava, near Annapolis. The group merged with the Labor Zionist youth movement Habonim Dror in April 1938.

References

Zionist youth movements
Youth organisations based in Poland
Youth organizations established in 1925